is a Japanese football player who plays for Ventforet Kofu.

Playing career
Yamamoto was born in Ichikawa on June 26, 1980. He joined J1 League club JEF United Ichihara from youth team in 1999. He debuted against Nagoya Grampus Eight on March 17, 2001 and played several matches in 2001 season. However he could hardly play in the match in 2002. In 2003, he moved to J2 League club Ventforet Kofu. He played many matches as substitute from 2003. In 2005, Ventforet finished at the 3rd place and was promoted to J1 first time in the club history. He also became a regular player as left side-back from 2006. After that, Ventforet repeated relegation to J2 and promotion to J1. From 2010, he played mainly as center back and defensive midfielder for a long time.

He scored the winning penalty in the 2022 Emperor's Cup Final, helping Ventforet Kofu to win the title at the penalty shoot-outs by 5–4.

Club statistics

Honours

Club
Ventforet Kofu
 Emperor's Cup: 2022

References

External links

Profile at Ventforet Kofu

1980 births
Living people
Association football people from Chiba Prefecture
Japanese footballers
J1 League players
J2 League players
JEF United Chiba players
Ventforet Kofu players
Association football defenders